Rear Admiral Joseph C. Hare is a Pennsylvania native, a 1972 graduate of the Naval ROTC program of Villanova University, and a 1978 graduate of the Villanova University School of Law. 

Following his training in naval communications and cryptography, he served as communications officer, electronic material officer, and cryptographic security officer in U.S. Atlantic Fleet destroyers Lowry (DD-770) and Corry (DD-817).

Afloat tours in the Naval Reserve have included deck watch officer in Emory S. Land (AS-39), weapons officer in Harold J. Ellison (DD-864), and selected reserve coordinator in Oliver Hazard Perry (FFG-7).

Shore billets have included executive officer of Shore Intermediate Maintenance Activity (SIMA) Philadelphia, Surface Group Four Squadron liaison officer, and plans officer of Naval Reserve Readiness Command Region Four.

Major staff billets have included assistant chief of staff to commander, Naval Base Philadelphia, and assistant deputy to commander, Iceland Defense Force.

Hare was promoted to flag rank in October, 1996.  Significant billets in flag rank included commander of Military Sealift Command Atlantic; commander of Military Sealift Command Europe; commander of Naval Reserve Readiness Command Region Four;  deputy commander of Naval Surface Force, U.S. Atlantic Fleet, and deputy for Training Integration, Naval Education and Training Command.  Hare retired on 1 March 2005.

Hare was the president of AgraCo Technologies International, LLC, a defense industry contractor, as well as a private consultant in legal and defense-industry-related matters. He has formerly served as the chief operating officer and general counsel of Granary Associates, Inc., a health-care-facility design and development company in Philadelphia, Pa. He has formerly served as a partner in the law firm of Weir & Partners, as the CEO of a 200-bed acute care hospital, as general counsel of a hospital system, and as treasurer and general counsel of a member firm of the Philadelphia Stock Exchange. Hare is a member of the boards of various professional organizations, including the Philadelphia Council of the Navy League of the United States, the Philadelphia Chapter of the Surface Navy Association, the USO Of Pennsylvania and South Jersey, and the Armed Services Committee of the Union League of Philadelphia.

Hare resides in the suburbs of Philadelphia.  He has a daughter named Casey and a son named Joe.

Awards and decorations
Hare has been the recipient of the Distinguished Service Medal, the Legion of Merit (three awards), the Meritorious Service Medal (two awards), the Navy Commendation Medal (three awards), and various other service medals and ribbons.

External links

Official United States Navy Biography

United States Navy admirals
Recipients of the Legion of Merit
Year of birth missing (living people)
Villanova University alumni
Villanova University School of Law alumni
Living people
American health care chief executives
American chief operating officers